Santa Apolónia station is the southern terminus on the Blue Line of the Lisbon Metro.

History
Opened on December 19, 2007, in conjunction with the Terreiro do Paço station, the station is located on Avenida Infante D. Henrique, connecting to the Santa Apolónia railway station (North and Azambuja Lines). It takes its name from the railway station, which was constructed partly on the site of the old Convent of Santa Apolónia.

The architectural design of the station is by Leopoldo de Almeida Rosa.

Connections

Urban buses and Interurban buses

Carris 
 206 Cais do Sodré ⇄ Bairro Padre Cruz (morning service)
 210 Cais do Sodré ⇄ Prior Velho (morning service)
 706 Cais do Sodré ⇄ Estação Santa Apolónia
 712 Santa Apolónia (Lisbon Metro) ⇄ Alcântara Mar (Museu do Oriente)
 728 Restelo - Av. das Descobertas ⇄ Portela - Av. dos Descobrimentos
 734 Martim Moniz ⇄ Estação Santa Apolónia
 735 Cais do Sodré ⇄ Hospital de Santa Maria
 759 Restauradores ⇄ Estação Oriente (Interface)
 781 Cais do Sodré ⇄ Prior Velho
 782 Cais do Sodré ⇄ Praça José Queirós
 794 Terreiro do Paço ⇄ Estação Oriente (Interface)

Rail

Comboios de Portugal 
Lisboa - Santa Apolónia ⇄ Azambuja
 Lisboa - Santa Apolónia ⇄ Entroncamento (Regional)
 Lisboa - Santa Apolónia ⇄ Torres Vedras (Regional)
 Lisboa - Santa Apolónia ⇄ Caldas da rainha (Regional)
 Lisboa - Santa Apolónia ⇄ Castelo Branco (Regional)
 Lisboa - Santa Apolónia ⇄ Porto-Campanhã (Regional)
 Lisboa - Santa Apolónia ⇄ Guarda (Regional)
 Lisboa - Santa Apolónia ⇄ Tomar (InterRegional)
 Lisboa - Santa Apolónia ⇄ Porto - Campanhã (InterRegional)
 Lisboa - Santa Apolónia ⇄ Porto - Campanhã (Intercities)
 Lisboa - Santa Apolónia ⇄ Braga (Intercities)
 Lisboa - Santa Apolónia ⇄ Guimarães (Intercities)
 Lisboa - Santa Apolónia ⇄ Guarda (Intercities)
 Lisboa - Santa Apolónia ⇄ Covilhã (Intercities)
 Lisboa - Santa Apolónia ⇄ Porto - Campanhã (Alfa Pendular)
 Lisboa - Santa Apolónia ⇄ Braga (Alfa Pendular)
 Lisboa - Santa Apolónia ⇄ Guimarães (Alfa Pendular)
 Lisboa - Santa Apolónia ⇄ Hendaye (International)
 Lisboa - Santa Apolónia ⇄ Madrid (International)

See also
 List of Lisbon metro stations

References

External links

Blue Line (Lisbon Metro) stations
Railway stations opened in 2007
2007 establishments in Portugal